The 2000 GP Ouest-France was the 64th edition of the GP Ouest-France cycle race and was held on 30 July 2000. The race started and finished in Plouay. The race was won by Michele Bartoli of the Mapei team.

General classification

References

2000
2000 in road cycling
2000 in French sport
July 2000 sports events in France